Valery Viktorovych Shiryaev (born 28 August 1963) is a retired ice hockey player who played in the Soviet Hockey League.  He played for Sokil Kyiv and was named top defenceman in the Soviet League in 1990 and 1991. He won a gold medal in the 1989 World Ice Hockey Championships for the Soviet Union. Later, he played for Ukraine in several World Championships and at the 2002 Winter Olympics. He was named best defenceman at the 1995 C1 Pool World Championships.

He was inducted into the Russian and Soviet Hockey Hall of Fame in 1989.

External links
 Russian and Soviet Hockey Hall of Fame bio
 

1963 births
EHC Biel players
EV Zug players
Genève-Servette HC players
HC Davos players
HC La Chaux-de-Fonds players
Ice hockey players at the 2002 Winter Olympics
Olympic ice hockey players of Ukraine
Living people
SC Bern players
SCL Tigers players
Sportspeople from Kharkiv
Soviet ice hockey defencemen
Ukrainian ice hockey defencemen
Ukrainian ice hockey coaches
Sokil Kyiv players
Honoured Masters of Sport of the USSR